"Don Juan" is a Latin pop song by Colombian recording artist Fanny Lu. It was released October 10, 2012, as the third single and from his third studio album Felicidad y Perpetua (2011). More later the song was included on the Chino & Nacho's EP Supremo: Reloaded.

Chart performance 
"Don Juan" was No. 1 in Venezuela for two consecutives weeks, being her third consecutive number-one single at the top of the Record Report. The song debuted at No. 39 on the US Tropical Songs chart on February 12, 2013, peaking at No. 4.

Track listing 
Digital download
 "Don Juan (feat. Chino & Nacho)" -

Charts

Weekly charts

Year-end charts

References 

2012 singles
Chino & Nacho songs
Fanny Lu songs
Spanish-language songs
Record Report Top 100 number-one singles
Record Report Top Latino number-one singles
Universal Music Latino singles
2011 songs
Songs written by Fanny Lu
Songs written by Andrés Munera